A number of ships of the Royal Navy were named Haldon, including -

Royal Navy ship names